This is a list of islands in the U.S. state of Alabama.

Aikin Island
Alligator Island
Barton Island
Bee Tree Island - historical
Bell Island
Bellefonte Island
Big Island - Baldwin County
Big Island - Mobile County
Big Island - historical - Chilton County
Big Island - historical - Tuscaloosa County
Big Rock
Big Rock Island
Bilbo Island
Blakeley Island
Brush Creek Island - historical
Buck Island - Colbert County
Buck Island - Limestone County
Buck Island - Mount Carmel, Marshall County
Buck Island - historical - Columbus City, Marshall County
Buckmans Island
Buffalo Island
Buffingtons Island
Bullocks Islands
Burman Island
Buzzard Island - Montgomery County
Buzzard Island - Shelby County
Byrams Island
Caddell Island
Canal Island
Cat Island
Cedar Island - Mobile County
Cedar Island - historical - Coosa County
Cedar Island - Lauderdale County
Chigger Island - historical
Colbert Island - historical
Colgins Island - historical
Colvins Island
Cooper Island
Copeland Island
Corn Island - historical
Cox Island - historical
Crawfords Island - historical
Crow Creek Island
Crusoe Island - historical
Curry Island
Isle aux Dames
Dans Island
Dauphin Island
Deadlake Island
Denson Island - historical
Drake Island
Dutch Island
Eagle Island - historical
Eagle Nest
Edith Hammock
Elliott Island
Esslinger Island
Falling Rock
Fennel Island - historical
Fig Tree Island
Finley Island
Fisher Island
Five Acre Island - historical
Flint Creek Island
Flint River Towhead - historical
Forty Acres Island - historical
Foshee Islands
Gaillard Island
Gallus Island
Gardiner Island
Gibson Towhead
Gilchrist Island - Coosa County
Gilchrist Island - historical - Lawrence County
Ginhouse Island
Goat Island - Coosa County
Goat Island - Cullman County
Goat Island - Marshall County
Goat Island - Mobile County
Goat Island - Shelby County
Goat Towhead
Godfreys Island
Geese Island
Goose Pond Island
Gourd Island - historical
Grande Batture Islands
Grass Island
Gravine Island
Grissom Island
Gull Island
Gum Island
Gun Island
Haines Island
Hales Island - historical
The Hammock
Harmons Island
Harrys Island - historical
Isle aux Herbes
Hillmans Island - historical
Hobbs Island - Madison County
Hobbs Island - Wilcox County
Hodge Island
Hog Island - Cherokee County
Hog Island - historical - Colbert County
Hollingers Island
Houses Island
Houstons Island - historical
Howard Island - historical
Hurricane Island
Jacks Island - historical
Jackson Island
Jim Burns Island
Jones Field
Keeling Island
Kings Island - historical
Knight Island - historical
Knowles Island
Kogers Island
Kogers Rock - historical
Lady Island
Larkins Towhead - historical
Larry Island
Lenhart Island
Little Bay Island
Little Buck Island - historical
Little Dauphin Island
Little Island
Little Peach Island - historical
Little Rock Island
Little Sand Island
Littles Island - historical
Long Island - Jackson County
Long Island - Mobile County
Manacks Island - historical
Mariner Island
Marsh Island - Grand Bay, Mobile County
Marsh Island - Heron Bay, Mobile County
Mason Island - Limestone County
Mason Island - historical - Talladega County
McCoys Island - historical
McDuffie Island
McKee Island - historical
Merkl Island
Mon Louis Island - Mobile County
Monger Island
Mound Island
Mud Island
Mule Island
The Negrohead - historical
Noman Towhead
Noxubee Island
Ogletree Island
Ohio Island - historical
Ono Island
Parker Island
Patton Island
Peach Island
Pelican Island
Perdido Key
Peters Island
Pine Island - historical
Pinto Island
Pippin Towhead
Polk Island - historical
Price Island
Prince Island
Pruetts Island
Rabbit Island
Raccoon Island
Real Island
Resting Island - historical
Richardson Island
Robbers Island
Robertsons Island - historical
Robinson Island - Orange Beach, Baldwin County
Robinson Island - Stiggins Lake, Baldwin County
Rock Garden
Rock Island - historical
Round Island - Clarke County
Round Island - Mobile County
Russell Island
Sam Acre Island
Sand Island - historical
Sedge Grass Island - historical
Sevenmile Island
Sheep Island - historical
Shiny Rock
Sipsey Island - historical
Smith Island - Choctaw County
Smith Island - Monroe County
Smith Island - Shelby County
Snake Island
South Island
South Rigolets Island
State Line Island
Steamboat Island - historical
Steins Island
Strawberry Island (New York)
Streets Island
Sweetgum Island - historical
Tait Island
Ten Islands - historical
Terrapin Island
Thompsons Island - historical
Tick Island - historical
Traylor Island
Treasure Island
Turkey Chute Island - historical
Turtleback Island
Twelvemile Island
Twelvemile Rock
Vienna Island - historical
Walker Island - Baldwin County
Walker Island - historical - Colbert County
Ware Island
Waterloo Island - historical
Weaver Island
Whites Island
Wildmans Island
Woods Island - St. Clair County
Woods Island - Tallapoosa County
Woody's Island
Wortham Mill Island
Youngs Island - Dadeville, Tallapoosa County
Youngs Island - Our Town, Tallapoosa County

External links

GNIS feature query

Islands

Alabama